Heinrich 'Heiri' Suter (10 July 1899  – 6 November 1978) was a Swiss road racing cyclist. Excelling mainly in the classics, Suter was the first non-Belgian winner of the Tour of Flanders in 1923. Two weeks after his win in the Tour of Flanders, he won Paris–Roubaix, becoming the first cyclist to win both classics in the same year. He also holds a record six victories in Züri-Metzgete, Switzerland's most important one-day race.

Suter won 58 professional races, including:
 Grand Prix Wolber (unofficial world championship): (1922, 1925)
 Road champion of Switzerland: (1920, 1921, 1922, 1926, 1929)
 motor-paced champion of Switzerland: (1932, 1933)
 Züri-Metzgete: (1919, 1920, 1922, 1924, 1928, 1929)
 Paris–Roubaix: (1923)
 Tour of Flanders: (1923)
 Bordeaux–Paris (1925)
 Paris–Tours: (1926, 1927)

Career

1919
 1st - Züri-Metzgete
 1st — Grand Prix Aurore
 1st — Tour de Zürich
1920
  National road champion
 1st - Züri-Metzgete
 1st — Tour du Nord-Ouest
1921
  National road champion
 1st — Grand Prix Aurore
 1st — Tour de Zürich
 1st — Tour du Nord-Ouest
 1st — Genève-Zürich
 1st — Tour de Suisse Orientale
 1st — Prix de Génève
1922
 1st - Grand Prix Wolber
  National road champion
 1st - Züri-Metzgete
 1st — Tour du Nord-Ouest
 1st — Circuit de Neuchâtel
 1st — Circuit de Fribourg
 1st — Circuit du Vaudois
 1st — Munich-Zürich
 1st, 2 stages — Paris-Saint-Etienne
1923
 1st - Tour of Flanders
 1st - Paris–Roubaix
 1st — Tour du Nord-Ouest
 1st — Zürich-Munich
 1st — Prix de Génève
1924
 1st - Züri-Metzgete
 1st — Circuit de Champagne (1st, 2 Stages)
 1st — Tour du Lac Léman
 1st — Grand Prix Griffon
 1st — Zürich-La Chaux-de-Fonds
 1st, 3 stages — Bordeaux-Marseille
 1st — Prix de Génève
1925
 1st - Grand Prix Wolber
 1st - Bordeaux–Paris
 1st — Circuit de Champagne
 1st — Circuit du Vaudois
1926
  National road champion
 1st - Paris–Tours
 1st — Tour de Cologne
 1st — Circuit de Cologne
 1st — Tour de Francfort
 1st — Tour du Württemberg
 1st — Circuit de la Montagne
 1st — Grand Prix Yverdon
1927
 1st - Paris–Tours
 1st — Tour du Lac Léman
 1st — Grand Prix Yverdon
 1st — Tour de Francfort
1928
 1st - Züri-Metzgete
1929
  National road champion
 1st - Züri-Metzgete
 1st — Tour du Nord-Ouest
 1st — Tour du Lac Léman
 1st — Circuit Franco-Suisse
1932
  National motor-paced champion
1933
  National motor-paced champion

References

External links

1899 births
1978 deaths
People from Aarau District
Swiss male cyclists
Sportspeople from Aargau